Seebaer van Nieuwelant (born 27 July 1623), son of Willemtgen and Willem Janszoon, was born south of Dirk Hartog Island, in present-day Western Australia. His father, not to be confused with the earlier Dutch explorer of the same name, was a midshipman from Amsterdam. He and his wife were aboard the Leijden, commanded by Claes Hermanszoon, which was charting the coast at the time. Their son's name in Dutch meant "sea-born (or sea-birth) of new land".

Claims have appeared in Australian newspapers in recent times of first children born to European parents in each of the colonies:

New South Wales
Commonly cited as the first white child or the first white female born in Australia, Rebecca Small (22 September 1789 – 30 January 1883), was born in Port Jackson, the eldest daughter of John Small a boatswain in the First Fleet which arrived at Botany Bay in January 1788. Later articles put her as the second white female, then with historical evidence of convict women having given birth earlier, the claim (originating with a notable descendant) was qualified with the expression "free born", but even so, genealogists reckon she may have been the twentieth.
Small married Francis Oakes on 27 January 1806; George Oakes and Francis Oakes were two of their sons.

Victoria 
William James Hobart Thorne (25 November 1803 – 2 July 1872) was born at Port Phillip, in what was still part of New South Wales but became Victoria, during the short-lived settlement led by Lieutenant-Governor David Collins. Thorne married Elizabeth Norman (c. 1812 – 9 January 1876) on 1 January 1830.
Other names have been proposed:
A child, name not yet found, born at Port Phillip on 30 December 1835 to James and Mary Gilbert.
A child, name not yet found, born in 1836 to Sara Honey (c. 1808 – 10 April 1904)
John Wood Fleming (3 June 1837 – )
Richmond Henty (3 August 1837 – 1904) has been claimed as the first or second
the congregation of these dates can have nothing to do with the declaration of the Colony of Victoria, which occurred much later, on 1 July 1851.

South Australia
A girl child was born at sea sometime between May and July 1836 aboard Duke of York to T. Hudson Beare and Lucy Ann Beare née Loose (c. 1803 – 3 September 1837), but died before touching land at Kangaroo Island. Mrs Beare died following a later childbirth.
John Rapid Light Hoare (7 November 1836 – )
Fanny Lipson Finniss (1 January 1837 – 30 May 1865), daughter of B. T. Finniss. She married Frederick George Morgan on 15 December 1853. 
Also noteworthy, Henry Wilkins (1 January 1837 – ), father of Hubert Wilkins, was born to William Wilkins and Mary Wilkins, née Chivers, passengers aboard Emma, arr. October 1836.
Elizabeth Ann Hobbs, daughter of Frederick and Mary, born 16 April 1837, acknowledged the priority of Fanny Finniss.

Queensland
Amity Moreton Thompson (later Wright) (21 September 1824 - October 1900). Amity was the daughter of one of the detachment of guards sent to establish the colony of Moreton Bay. She was named after the ship on which her parents, Robert and Mary, sailed and the place they landed.
Sarah McCann (later Graham) (1831– )
Jimmy Hexton (25 September 1832 – 12 February 1914)

Western Australia
Sophia Roe (25 December 1829 – 6 October 1901) was a daughter of Capt. John Septimus Roe. She married Samuel Pole Phillips on 29 April 1847.

Tasmania
son, name not yet found, born c. April 1803 to Mrs and Dr Matthew Bowden (1779 – 23 October 1814) aboard Lady Nelson while in Derwent River.
Jane, surname not yet found, (c. May 1803 – May 1873) was born shortly after her parents arrived by Lady Nelson. She married William Bradshaw.
(William) Dalrymple Keating (2 December 1804 – 11 August 1884)
First white male child born in Sullivan Cove, River Derwent - George Kearly Jnr born 9 July 1804 per gravestone but possibly 14 July 1804 per birth record  and died 15th July 1804, son of George Kearly, a colonial marine & Mary Kearly nee Cook. Gravestone in Saint David's Burial Ground, 20 Sandy Bay Road, Hobart, Tasmania.

Northern Territory 
Elizabeth Melville Richardson, born c. 27 March 1827 to John and Jane Richardson on Fort Dundas, Melville Island.

See also
First white child

References 

History of immigration to Australia
 
 

First things